James Robert Laxer (22 December 1941 – 23 February 2018), also known as Jim Laxer, was a Canadian political economist, historian, public intellectual, and political activist who served as a professor at York University. Best known as co-founder of the Waffle, on whose behalf he ran for the leadership of the New Democratic Party in 1971, he was the author of more than two dozen books, mostly on Canadian political economy and history.

Early life and family
Laxer was born in Montreal, Quebec, on 22 December 1941 and was the son of Edna May (née Quentin) and Robert Laxer, a psychologist, professor, author, and political activist. His father was Jewish and his mother was from a Protestant family. Both were members of the Communist Party of Canada and its public face, the Labor-Progressive Party, with Robert Laxer being a national organizer for the party. The Laxers left the party, along with many other members, following Khrushchev's Secret Speech revealing Joseph Stalin's crimes, and the 1956 Soviet invasion of Hungary. James Laxer wrote about his experiences growing up during this period in his memoir Red Diaper Baby: A Boyhood in the Age of McCarthyism. His father came to serve as a significant influence on his political worldview.

His paternal grandfather was a rabbi and his maternal grandfather was a minister and Christian missionary to China, where Laxer's mother was born. His brother, Gordon Laxer, became a political economist, author, and founder of the Parkland Institute.

He received a Bachelor of Arts degree from the University of Toronto and Master of Arts (following approval of his thesis French-Canadian Newspapers and Imperial Defence, 1899–1914 in 1967) and Doctor of Philosophy degrees from Queen's University. He was an active student journalist both at The Varsity at the University of Toronto and later at the Queen's Journal and was elected president of Canadian University Press in 1965.

Laxer married three times. He married Diane Taylor in 1965, from whom he was divorced in 1969. He married Krista Mäeots in 1969 with whom he had two children: Michael and Katherine (known as "Kate"). They were separated at the time of her death in 1978. Laxer married Sandra Price in 1979 with whom he had two more children: Emily and Jonathan.

Political career
In 1969, Laxer, along with his father Robert Laxer, Mel Watkins, and others, founded the Waffle, a left-wing group influenced by the New Left, the anti–Vietnam War movement, and Canadian economic nationalism, that tried to influence the direction of the New Democratic Party (NDP). Laxer was a principal author of their Manifesto for an Independent Socialist Canada in 1969 alongside Ed Broadbent and Gerald Caplan. The manifesto was debated at the 1969 federal NDP convention and was rejected by the delegates in favour of a more moderate declaration.

In 1971, Laxer ran for the leadership of the federal NDP and shocked the convention by winning one-third of the vote on the fourth and final ballot against party stalwart David Lewis. The Waffle was ultimately forced out of the NDP and briefly became a political party under the name Movement for an Independent Socialist Canada. Laxer and other Wafflers unsuccessfully ran for Parliament in 1974. This electoral failure led to the Waffle's demise, and Laxer concentrated on his work at York University, where he was a professor of political science for 47 years, and in broadcasting.

In 1981, he was hired as director of research for the federal NDP, but left in controversy in 1983 when he published a report critiquing the party's economic policy as being "out of date".

Academic, writer, and broadcaster
Laxer hosted The Real Story, a nightly half-hour current affairs program on TVOntario in the early 1980s. He also variously wrote a column and op-ed pieces for the Toronto Star from the 1980s until shortly before his death, as well as op-ed pieces for The Globe and Mail. He also played "Talleyrand", a mock political insider, on CBC Radio's Morningside in the 1980s.

Laxer co-wrote and presented the five-part National Film Board documentary series Reckoning: The Political Economy of Canada in 1986, which examined Canada's economic and political relationships with the United States and Canada's place in the changing global economy. Laxer and his co-writer won a Gemini Award in 1988 for Best Writing in an Information/Documentary  Program or Series for episode one of Reckoning titled "In Bed with an Elephant". The Canadian Broadcasting Corporation refused to air the series due to its critical view of free trade with the United States, which was being negotiated at the time, and it aired instead on TVOntario and other educational channels in Canada as well as a number of PBS stations in the United States.

A democratic socialist, Laxer believed that Canadian economic nationalism was a progressive force against the United States and American imperialism. He wrote extensively about the influence of American multinational corporations in the Canadian economy, particularly in the oil and gas industry, and his agitation helped lead to the creation of Petro-Canada. The creation of the Foreign Investment Review Agency, and the Canadian Development Corporation in the 1970s is also attributed in part to the work of Laxer, Watkins, and the Waffle. In the 1980s he strongly opposed the adoption of the Canada–US Free Trade Agreement, though he still believed that free trade agreements were capable of being used to the advantage of the political left through the entrenchment of social charters.

Laxer died suddenly and unexpectedly in Paris of heart-related problems on 23 February 2018 while in Europe researching a book on Canada's role in the Second World War.

Selected works

See also
 Canadian Dimension

References

Citations

Works cited

External links
James Laxer blog
James Laxer at rabble.ca
James Laxer's profile at York University

1941 births
2018 deaths
20th-century Canadian historians
21st-century Canadian historians
Canadian Broadcasting Corporation people
Canadian columnists
Canadian economists
Canadian nationalists
Canadian political scientists
Canadian radio personalities
Canadian socialists
Canadian television hosts
Canadian Screen Award winners
Historians of Canada
Independent candidates in the 1974 Canadian federal election
Jewish Canadian politicians
Jewish socialists
Journalists from Montreal
New Democratic Party people
Canadian democratic socialists
Politicians from Montreal
Politicians from Toronto
Post-Keynesian economists
Queen's University at Kingston alumni
Toronto Star people
University of Toronto alumni
Writers about globalization
Writers from Montreal
Writers from Toronto
Academic staff of York University
Jewish Canadian journalists
Jewish Canadian filmmakers